"Would I Lie to You?" is a song by American soul music duo Charles & Eddie. Written by Mick Leeson and Peter Vale, and produced by Josh Deutsch, it was released in August 1992 as the debut single from the duo's first album, Duophonic (1992). It proved to be their biggest hit and a major international success. The song reached number-one on the UK Singles Chart for two weeks in November 1992, and was also number one in New Zealand, Germany, Austria and Zimbabwe. It was a top five hit in several other European countries, while in Australia and Canada it went to number three. The single became a top 20 hit in the US, peaking at number 11 on the Cash Box Top 100 and number 13 on the Billboard Hot 100. It achieved award-winning sales, earning a platinum record in the UK, a gold record in both Germany and Austria and silver record award in France. 

The songwriters, Leeson and Vale, received the 1992 Ivor Novello award for Best Song Musically and Lyrically. American singer and former teen idol Donny Osmond covered the song in 2002, while both John Gibbons and David Guetta released their covers in 2016.

Chart performance
"Would I Lie to You?" was very successful on the singles charts all over the world. In Europe, it went to number-one in Austria, Flemish Belgium, Germany and the United Kingdom, where the song hit number-one on November 15, 1992, after four weeks on the chart. It also reached number two in Denmark, France, Ireland, the Netherlands and Switzerland. In addition, the single was a top 10 hit also in Italy, Norway, Poland and Sweden. On the Eurochart Hot 100, "Would I Lie to You?" peaked at number two in January 1993. In the US, it reached number 11 on the Cash Box Top 100 and number 13 on the Billboard Hot 100, while reaching number three in Canada. In Zimbabwe, the single went to number-one. 

It was awarded with a gold record in Austria and Germany, with a sale of 15,000 and 250,000 singles. In France, the song received a silver record, with a sale of 125,000 and in the United Kingdom, it earned a platinum record, with 600,000 singles sold.

Critical reception
The song received favorable reviews from music critics. AllMusic editor Alex Henderson felt that Charles & Eddie "shows a great deal of promise on smooth pop-soul offerings" like "Would I Lie to You?", remarking that they "show their appreciation of classic soul in a very pop-friendly way". Larry Flick from Billboard noted that the duo "is quickly picking up pop radio adds with this delightful twirl into retro-R&B territory. Rich lead vocals are supported by Motown-styled harmonies, rumbling Hammond organ fills, and an insinuating, live drum beat." Another editor complimented it as "outstanding". Randy Clark from Cash Box stated that "the two still manage to create a modern sound through production techniques and danceable beats". Tom Ewing of Freaky Trigger described it as "an irresistibly sweet record", adding that "it's dreaminess all the way down: if anyone’s going to end up hurt it'll be them, but that's an unimaginable outcome as long as the record's playing." Rufer & Fell from the Gavin Report commented, "What a hip single! Charles Pettigrew and Eddie Chacon incorporate a soulful sound reminiscent of R&B from years gone by, ala Sam and Dave etc. You only need one listen and we guarantee you'll push PLAY again. Would we lie to you!?" 

Connie Johnson from Los Angeles Times wrote that "Would I Lie to You" "is not to be missed, as solid, sleek and comfy a soulmobile as you're likely to encounter." In his weekly UK chart commentary James Masterton viewed it as a soul ballad "in the classic mould". Pan-European magazine Music & Media wrote that "one of soul afficionados' [sic] wildest dreams: a duet between Smokey Robinson and the late Marvin Gaye. With this single it's more than just wishful thinking." Neville Farmer from Music Week remarked that it "seemed like a one-off, a throw back to the classic soul style which stuck out like a sore thumb in the midst of the electronic techno filling the charts." A reviewer from People Magazine felt that "it would be hard to get a better soul vibe and groove than the exquisite "Would I Lie to You?"." Pop Rescue stated that "there is nothing to dislike about this song – the music, lyrics, and the harmonised vocals are spot on." Adam Higginbotham from Select declared it as "a fantastic single" and "so faultlessly polished and timeless".

Music video
The accompanying music video for "Would I Lie to You" sees Charles & Eddie performing the song at various locations in New York City. Occasionally, several different young women are seen walking around the city. Some scenes of the duo have a dark blue or sepia tone. And sometimes also features a fractured screen with two boxes, showing different images at the same time. As the video ends, Charles & Eddie continues to sing in the late hours as it gets dark outside. It received heavy rotation on MTV Europe and was later published by Vevo on YouTube in March 2009. It had generated more than 59 million views as of December 2022.

Track listings
 7" single
 "Would I Lie to You?" (Radio Edit) – 3:41
 "Would I Lie to You?" (Club House Mix) – 5:04

 CD single
 "Would I Lie to You?" (Radio Edit) – 3:41
 "Would I Lie to You?" (Club House Mix) – 5:04

 CD maxi single
 "Would I Lie to You?" (Radio Edit) – 3:41
 "Would I Lie to You?" (Club House Mix) – 5:04
 "Would I Lie to You?" (Truth and Soul Mix) – 3:57
 "Would I Lie to You?" (Funky Way Extended Mix) – 5:01

Charts and sales

Weekly charts

Year-end charts

Certifications

John Gibbons version

Irish DJ and producer John Gibbons released a cover of the song titled "Would I Lie to You". Gibbons co-produced the song with Colin Hanley, while Wez Clarke mixed the track with mastering from Nick Bennett. It was released for digital download on August 12, 2016.

Charts

David Guetta, Cedric Gervais and Chris Willis version

French DJs David Guetta and Cedric Gervais, and American singer Chris Willis released a cover of the song titled "Would I Lie to You". It was released to digital download through Jack Back Records, Parlophone, and Warner Music Group on September 30, 2016.

Charts

Weekly charts

Year-end charts

Certifications

Release history

References

1992 songs
1992 debut singles
2016 songs
2016 singles
Charles & Eddie songs
David Guetta songs
Cedric Gervais songs
Chris Willis songs
Number-one singles in Austria
Number-one singles in Germany
Number-one singles in New Zealand
Number-one singles in Zimbabwe
UK Singles Chart number-one singles
Male vocal duets
Songs written by Mick Leeson
Songs written by Peter Vale
Capitol Records singles
Parlophone singles
Warner Music Group singles
Song recordings produced by David Guetta